The Imperial City (Chữ Hán: 皇城) is a walled enclosure within the citadel (Kinh thành; Chữ Hán: 京城) of the city of Huế, the former imperial capital of Vietnam during the Nguyễn dynasty. It contains the palaces that housed the imperial family, as well as shrines, gardens, and villas for mandarins. Constructed in 1803 under Emperor Gia Long as a new capital, it mostly served a ceremonial function during the French colonial period. After the end of the monarchy in 1945, it suffered heavy damage and neglect during the Indochina Wars through the 1980s. The Imperial City was designated as a UNESCO World Heritage Site in 1993 and is undergoing restoration.

History

Nguyễn dynasty

In June 1802, after more than a century of division and the defeat of the Tây Sơn dynasty, Nguyễn Ánh ascended the throne of a unified Vietnam and proclaimed himself Emperor Gia Long. With a nation now stretching from the Red River Delta to the Mekong Delta, Emperor Gia Long moved the capital from the northern Thăng Long (current Hanoi) to Huế, the ancestral seat of the Nguyễn lords. Gia Long looked to "Confucianism and Chinese models of statecraft" as the best modes of authority, and with this ideology, he ordered the construction of a palace complex based on Beijing's Forbidden City in Huế. Geomancers were consulted as to the propitious location site for the new city, and construction began in 1803. The original earthwork was later reinforced and faced with brick and stone resulting in -thick ramparts.
 
The citadel was oriented to face the Hương River (Perfume River) to the southeast. This differs from Beijing's Forbidden City in which faces true south. Rather than concentric rings centered on the Emperor's palace, the imperial residence itself is offset toward the southeast side of the citadel, nearer the river. A second set of tall walls and a second moat were constructed around this Imperial City, within which many edifices were added in a series of gated courtyards, gardens, pavilions and palaces. The entire complex was the seat of power until the imposition of the French protectorate in the 1880s. Thereafter it existed mostly to carry on symbolic traditions until the Nguyễn dynasty was ousted in 1945, with the Proclamation of Independence of the Democratic Republic of Vietnam. The abdication ceremony of Emperor Bảo Đại took place at the Imperial City on 30 August 1945.

Republican era

At its prime, the Purple Forbidden City had many buildings and hundreds of rooms. Once vacated it suffered from neglect, termite ravages, and inclement weather including a number of cyclones. Most destructive were man-made crises as evidenced in the bullet holes still visible from the military conflicts of the 20th century.

Major losses occurred in 1947 when the Việt Minh seized the Citadel in February. The French led counter-attack laid siege and the six-week ensuing battle destroyed many of the major structures. The core of the city including the Imperial Palace was burned.

The Citadel came under fire again in the early morning hours of January 31, 1968, as part of the Tet Offensive a Division-sized force of People's Army of Vietnam and Viet Cong soldiers launched a coordinated attack on Huế seizing most of the city. During the initial phases of the Battle of Huế, due to Huế's religious and cultural status, United States Army troops were ordered not to bomb or shell the city, for fear of destroying the historic structures; but as casualties mounted in house-to-house fighting these restrictions were progressively lifted and the fighting caused substantial damage to the Imperial City. Viet Cong troops occupied some portions of the citadel while South Vietnamese troops occupied others; and allied warplanes targeted the anti-aircraft guns the communists had mounted on the citadel's outer towers. Out of 160 buildings, only 10 major sites remain after the battle, such as the Thái Hòa and Cần Thanh temples, Thế Miếu, and Hiển Lâm Các. 

The city was made a UNESCO World Heritage site in 1993 as part of the Complex of Huế Monuments. The buildings that still remain are being restored and preserved. The latest, and so far largest, restoration project is planned to conclude in 2015.

Layout
The grounds of the Imperial City are protected by fortified ramparts , and ringed by a moat. The water in the moat is routed from the Perfume River through a series of sluice gates. This enclosure is the citadel (Kinh thành).

Within the Imperial City is the Purple Forbidden City (Tử cấm thành; 紫禁城), a term identical to the Forbidden City in Beijing. Access to the innermost enclosure was restricted to the imperial family.

Imperial City gates
 Cửa Đông Nam (Southeast Gate), also called cửa Thượng Tứ
 Cửa Chính Đông (East Gate) also called cửa Đông Ba
 Cửa Đông Bắc (Northeast Gate) also called cửa Trài or cửa Mang Cá nhỏ
 Cửa Chính Bắc (North Gate), also known as cửa Hậu or cửa Mang Cá lớn
 Cửa Tây (West Gate)
 Cửa Thể Nhân, popularly called cửa Ngăn

Purple Forbidden City main gates
 Ngọ Môn (午門) (south)
 Cửa Hòa Bình (和平門) (north)
 Cửa Chương Đức (彰德門) (west)
 Cửa Hiển Nhơn (顯仁門) (east)

Outer Court
 Điện Thái Hòa (太和殿)
 Điện Phụng Tiên (奉先殿)
 Cung Trường Sanh (長生宮)
 Cung Diên Thọ (延壽宮)

Temples and places of worship
 Triệu Miếu (肇廟)
 Thái Miếu (太廟)
 Hưng Miếu (興廟)
 Thế Miếu (世廟)
 Điện Phụng Tiên (奉先殿)
 Hiển Lâm Các (顯臨閣)

Inner Court
 Đại Cung môn (大宮門)
 Tả vu (左廡), Hữu vu (右廡)
 Điện Cần Chánh (勤政殿)
 Điện Võ Hiển (武顯殿)
 Điện Văn Minh (文明殿)
 Điện Trinh Minh (貞明殿)
 Điện Quang Minh (光明殿)
 Điện Càn Thành (乾成殿)
 Điện Khôn Thái (坤泰殿)
 Viện Thuận Huy (順徽院)
 Viện Dưỡng Tâm (養心院)
 Ngự Tiền Văn phòng (御前文房)
 Lục Viện (六院)
 Điện Minh Thận (明慎殿)

Gardens
 Vườn Ngự Uyển (紹芳園)

Pavilions
 Lầu Kiến Trung (建忠樓)
 Thái Bình Lâu (太平樓)

Gallery

References

7. Hue Imperial City

External links 

 
 Hue Forbidden City
 The Noon Gate in Hue Imperial City

 
Tourist attractions in Huế